Belgium has well-developed Internet infrastructure, ranking among the top countries in the world in terms of total number of Internet users, fixed broadband users, mobile broadband users, and Internet hosts. Providers typically offer download speeds of 30Mbit/s to 1Gbit/s, and upload speeds of 10Mbit/s to 75Mbit/s. Historically, Belgian Internet providers have imposed data caps on their subscribers, but lately this practice has been disappearing as Belgian Internet infrastructure has expanded.

Law enforcement in Belgium does take action against crimes committed on the Internet and filters websites hosting content that is illegal under Belgian law. Individual freedom of expression online is typically not violated by the government unless the expression could be classified as holocaust denial or incitement to hatred.

Status
 Internet users: 8.6 million, 43rd in the world; 82.0% of the population, 27th in the world (2012).
 Fixed broadband: 3.6 million subscribers, 25th in the world; 34.1% of population, 12th in the world (2012). 	
 Mobile broadband: 3.5 million subscribers, 46th in the world; 33.7% of population, 48th in the world (2012).
 Internet hosts: 5.2 million, 21st in the world (2012).
 Top level domains: .be .brussels .gent .vlaanderen
 IPv4 addresses: 11.1 million, 0.3% of worldwide total, 1,068 addresses per person (2012).

DSL, ADSL, and VDSL
ADSL first appeared in Belgium in 1999, named Turboline. The first network was set up by the incumbent Belgian telecom operator Belgacom and has been expanding ever since. In 2004 nearly 90% of the entire territory had access to ADSL from Belgacom. Belgacom's daughter company Skynet was the first officially supported ADSL provider, but now many more have gained popularity and almost all provide full triple play services (Television/Internet/Telephone).

Alongside the Belgacom ADSL network, several operators including Scarlet, Mobistar and Versatel have created a secondary network, based on local loop unbundling.

In 2009 the competitors of Belgacom started to offer VDSL2 connections instead of ADSL2+.

Belgacom, rebranded into Proximus in 2014, is the only owner of historical telephone networks, available to households, in Belgium.
Other providers use Proximus's infrastructure as well.

Providers
 EDPnet
 Orange
 Proximus
 Scarlet
 Telenet
 United Telecom

Cable
Belgium also has cable networks. The biggest one, taken over by Telenet in 1997, covers almost all of Flanders. Speeds vary from 100 Mbit/s to 1 Gbit/s down. 

As of June 2020, 93% of Telenet's nodes support Gigabit speeds. If Gigabit speeds are not available on a customer's node, the second fastest speed Telenet offers for residential plans, is 400 Mbit/s.

Even with Gigabit download speeds, upload speeds are limited to 'only' 40 Mbit/s for residential plans. It is believed Telenet will not increase their upload speed, because DSL can not exceed 40 Mbit/s upload due to hardware restrictions, until Proximus rolls out supervectoring.
This means that for most households, 40 Mbit/s upload is the maximum they can get.
Only providers using fiber and LTE networks offer faster uploads, but home internet over LTE is nowhere near as popular (yet), and FttH networks are still pretty new in Belgium and not widely available.

As of 2020, Telenet and VOO are the only owners of coaxial networks (originally built for transferring radio and TV signals).
Other providers use their infrastructure as well.

Providers

 Orange Belgium (all of Belgium, using both Telenet and VOO's network)
 Telenet. (Flanders (Dutch speaking part) and multilingual Brussels)
 VOO. (Wallonia (French speaking part) and multilingual Brussels)

Bandwidth and transfer limits
Download speeds in Brussels are now reaching a good level, however, the majority of Belgians have bandwidth caps in place to limit the amount of data users can transfer through their connection.  Typically these are between 5GB/month and 1000GB/month and show that the competition in this market has not been strong enough to drive out these practices which have vanished in other western and eastern European countries.

In June 2008 the Belgian Internet providers Dommel and Yabu ADSL announced nationwide ADSL subscriptions without the data limits.

In February 2010 the major operators of Belgium, including Telenet and Belgacom, announced tariffs with unlimited caps, but still with FUP formulas (fair usage policy). However, some of them have adapted the FUP so it only counts on specific hours of the day.

IPv6 adoption

In 2014, Belgium has the world's highest adoption rate of IPv6 connectivity.

Internet censorship

 Not individually classified by the OpenNet Initiative (ONI), but included in ONI's regional overview for Europe.
 Freedom House reports in its Freedom in the World 2013 report that freedom of speech and the press are guaranteed by the constitution and generally respected by the government and that Internet access is unrestricted.

There are no government restrictions on access to the Internet or credible reports that the government monitors e-mail or Internet chat rooms without appropriate legal authority. Individuals and groups engage in the expression of views via the Internet, including by e-mail. The Belgian constitution and law provide for freedom of speech, including for members of the press, and the government generally respects these rights in practice. An independent press, an effective judiciary, and a functioning democratic political system combine to ensure freedom of speech and press. The constitution and legal code prohibit arbitrary interference with privacy, family, home, or correspondence, and the government generally respects these prohibitions in practice.

Subject to warrants requested by the prosecutor all Belgian Internet providers have been filtering several websites at the DNS level since April 2009. This may be done when the websites are engaged in illegal activities or when they display information that is "contrary to public order or morality". People who browse the Internet using one of these providers and hit a blocked website are redirected to a page that claims that the content of the website is illegal under Belgian law and therefore blocked. In contrast to other countries, the Web sites were filtered not because of displaying pornographic content but in order to guarantee the privacy rights of suspects or criminals who committed sexual offenses against children and whose identity was accordingly revealed in the targeted Web sites.

Holocaust denial and incitement to hatred are criminal offenses punishable by a minimum of eight days (for Holocaust denial) and one month (incitement to hatred) up to one-year in prison and fines, plus a possible revocation of the right to vote or run for public office.

See also
 Belgian National Internet eXchange (BNIX)
 Belnet, the Belgian national research network.
 DNS Belgium, manager of the .be top level domain.

References

External links
 Belgian National Internet eXchange (BNIX), website.
 Belnet, website of the Belgian national research network.
 DNS Belgium, website in English.

 

Belgium